Thomas Hardie Chalmers (October 20, 1884 – June 11, 1966) was an American opera singer and actor.

Biography
Chalmers was born on October 20, 1884 in New York City, the son of Thomas Hardie and Sophia Amanda (De Bann) Chalmers. In 1909, he went to Florence to study singing with Vincenzo Lombardi and made his operatic debut in May 1911 in Fossombrone as Marcello in La bohème. His first appearance in the United States was as Jack Rance in The Girl of the Golden West with  Henry Wilson Savage's English Grand Opera Company. Chalmers toured the United States with the company from 1911 to 12. He then sang as the leading baritone with the Boston National Opera Company and the Century Opera Company before making his Metropolitan Opera debut on November 17, 1917 as Valentin in Faust. He went on to appear regularly at the Met until 1922 and sang in the world premiere of Shanewis, the US premiere of Mârouf, and the first Met performances of La forza del destino and Crispino e la Comare.  His recordings were all made for Edison and covered a wide range of repertoire from folk songs to opera; he recorded both on cylinder and the Edison Disc Record formats.

(Note: A Zonophone 78 has been found by Chalmers. Because 5522-A and Believe Me If All Those Endearing Young Charms 5522-B)

Following a throat operation, Chalmers withdrew from opera and became a stage and film actor. His many stage roles included several Broadway premieres such as Landolfo in Pirandello's The Living Mask (Henry IV), 1924; Doctor Schindler in Schnitzler's  The Call of Life (Der Ruf des Lebens), 1925; Captain Adam Brant in O'Neill's Mourning Becomes Electra, 1931; Ben Loman in Miller's Death of a Salesman, 1949; and Richard Bravo in Maxwell Anderson's The Bad Seed, 1954.

One of Chalmers's earliest film roles was The Minister in the 1923 silent film Puritan Passions, based on Percy MacKaye's play The Scarecrow, which was in turn based on Feathertop, by Nathaniel Hawthorne. His last film role was The Judge in Martin Ritt's The Outrage, released in 1964. Chalmers also produced and directed several short comedy films written by Robert Benchley, including The Sex Life of the Polyp and The Treasurer's Report, both released in 1928. His voice can be heard as the narrator in two documentary films by Pare Lorentz, The Plow That Broke the Plains (1936) and The River (1938), both with scores by Virgil Thomson.

In the 1950s and '60s, Chalmers appeared on television as an actor in several drama anthology series including Westinghouse Studio One, CBS Television Workshop, Kraft Television Theatre, The DuPont Show of the Month, and Play of the Week. He also appeared in single episodes of The Further Adventures of Ellery Queen, The Defenders, Mister Peepers, and several other weekly series.

Chalmers' wife, Vilma Fiorelli, was originally from Florence. They were married in London on June 24, 1913. One of the couple's daughters, Vilma Fiora Chalmers, married the banker Alfred Hayes in 1937. Thomas Hardie Chalmers died on June 11, 1966 at the Laurelton Nursing Home in Greenwich, Connecticut. He was survived by his wife and his daughter, Vilma Hayes, wife of Alfred Hayes.

Filmography

References

Sources
Barnouw, Erik, Documentary: A History of the Non-fiction Film, Oxford University Press US, 1993, pp. 116–120. 
Metropolitan Opera, Chalmers, Thomas (Baritone), MetOpera Database
New York Times, "Carmen Sung at Century", December 24, 1913, p. 11.
New York Times, "Vilma F. Chalmers Has Church Bridal", December 31, 1937.
New York Times, "Thomas Chalmers, 82, Dead; Actor, Singer and Filmmaker", June 12, 1966, p. 87
 Saerchinger, César (ed.), International who's who in music and musical gazetteer, Current Literature Pub. Co., 1918, p. 3.
Thompson, Oscar, The American Singer A Hundred Years Of Success In Opera, The Dial Press, Inc., 1937, p. 246.

External links

Thomas Chalmers audio recordings 1-10 and 11-20 on the Internet Archive

1884 births
1966 deaths
American operatic baritones
American male musical theatre actors
American male film actors
Male actors from New York City
20th-century American male actors
20th-century American male opera singers
Edison Records artists